Paoligena is a genus of darkling beetles in the family Tenebrionidae, found in tropical Africa. It is the sole genus of the tribe Paoligenini.

References

Tenebrionoidea